Bad Reichenhall Rugby League Football Club are a rugby league club from Bad Reichenhall, Germany. They have played a few games against German opposition and have also hosted matches concerning the German national team. They are expected to join a new German domestic league in 2008. The club's colours are dominantly red with black. Currently the club has been focusing on youth development and getting rugby league played in the local schools.

In their first friendly match they beat RC Innsbruck of Austria, 45–27.

Rugby League 9s Participation

In 2006 the club took part in the Alpine League rugby league nines competition against several teams from Germany and Austria.

Rugby union
In 2009–10, the club participates at the third tier of the German rugby union league system, the local Regionalliga Bavaria.

See also

 Rugby league in Germany

External links
 Official Website
 Match Highlights

German rugby league teams
German rugby union clubs
Rugby union in Bavaria
Rugby clubs established in 2005
2005 establishments in Germany